Laevilitorina caliginosa is a species of sea snail, a marine gastropod mollusk in the family Littorinidae, the winkles or periwinkles.

Distribution

Description 
The maximum recorded shell length is 8 mm.

Habitat 
Minimum recorded depth is 0 m. Maximum recorded depth is 40 m.

References

 Pelseneer, P. (1903). Zoologie: Mollusques (Amphineures, Gastropodes et Lamellibranches). Résultats du Voyage du S.Y. Belgica en 1897-1898-1899 sous le commandement de A. de Gerlache de Gomery: Rapports Scientifiques (1901–1913). Buschmann: Anvers. 85, IX plates pp.
 Engl, W. (2012). Shells of Antarctica. Hackenheim: Conchbooks. 402 pp.

External links
  Griffiths, H.J.; Linse, K.; Crame, J.A. (2003). SOMBASE – Southern Ocean mollusc database: a tool for biogeographic analysis in diversity and evolution. Organisms Diversity and Evolution. 3: 207–213
  Reid D.G. (1989) The comparative morphology, phylogeny and evolution of the gastropod family Littorinidae. Philosophical Transactions of the Royal Society B 324: 1–110

Littorinidae
Gastropods described in 1849